Albin Gutman (born 17 December 1947, in Novo Mesto) is a Slovene general, who was Chief of the General Staff of the Slovenian Armed Forces (from 1 July 2006 to 5 May 2009). He is the only person in history of Slovenian Armed Forces who was twice on this position (first mandate was from 1993 to 1998).

He is also a veteran of the Slovenian War.

References 

1947 births
Living people
People from Novo Mesto
Slovenian generals
Chiefs of the General Staff (Slovenia)